Shatin Tsung Tsin Secondary School is a grammar school in Tai Wai, Sha Tin District, Hong Kong. Founded in 1985 by the Basel Mission (Sham Shui Po), the school's goal is to provide a good study environment for students in Sha Tin and realise Christian education ideals.

The school aims to empower every Shatin Tsung-Tsiner to be a self-disciplined, thoughtful, trustworthy and self-motivated
student who is willing to serve, and to help students enhance communication skills, problem solving skills and self-learning skills.

Curriculum 
The curricula of junior form aim at providing a comprehensive and well-balanced education while different combinations of courses are offered to senior formers so that they can choose their courses according to their interests and aptitude.

Subjects for Junior Secondary (S1-S3) 

S1: Chinese, English, English Literature, Mathematics, Integrated Science, Chinese History, World History, Geography, Liberal Studies, Technology, Putonghua, Arts-in-Life (visual arts, domestic science, music), Physical Education, Life Education and Christian Education.

S2: Chinese, English, English Literature, Mathematics, Physics, Chemistry, Biology, Chinese History, World History, Geography, Liberal Studies, Technology, Putonghua, Arts-in-Life(visual arts, 
domestic science, music), Physical Education, Life Education and Christian Education.

S3: Chinese, English, English Literature, Mathematics, Physics, Chemistry, Biology, Chinese History, World History, Geography, Liberal Studies, Economics, Business, Accounting and Financial Studies(BAFS), Technology, Putonghua, Arts-in-Life(visual arts, music), Physical Education, Life Education and Christian Education.

Subjects for New Senior Secondary (S4-S6) 

Core subjects: Chinese, English, Mathematics, Liberal Studies

Elective subjects: Physics, Chemistry, Biology, Information and Communication Technology, World History, Chinese History, Chinese Literature, Economics, Business, Accounting and Financial Studies(BAFS), Physical Education, Geography and Visual Arts
(For S5-S6, the school offers Mathematics Extended Module 1 and 2 for capable students.)

Achievements 

Since 1999, the school's recognitions and achievements include the following:
Funds granted by the Quality Education Committee for financing fifteen projects.
Highly complimentary remarks received from the Quality Assurance Inspection Team in 1999 after the team was invited by the school to conduct the Quality Assurance Inspection in the school year 1998-1999.
The Outstanding School Award in the domain of Management and Organization and the Certificate of Merit in the domain of Support for Students and the School Ethos conferred in 2001.
An invitation by the Curriculum Development Institute to be a Seed Project school in the school year 2001-2002 in the fields of Project Learning and Collaborative Planning Teaching to further develop quality education.
Participation in the mainland language teacher secondment scheme launched by the Curriculum Development Institute to help reform its curriculum.
An invitation by the Education Bureau to participate in the School Professional Collaborative Project to be one of the twenty resource schools.
An invitation to participate in the District Teachers Network Scheme in 2003-2004 to promote quality education.
Being commissioned to participate in the School Principal Support Partners Scheme in 2004-2005 to render support to other schools.
Being commissioned to participate in the School Support Partners Scheme in 2005-2007 to assist other secondary schools in their implementing curriculum reform in Liberal Studies.
Being commissioned to participate in the Professional Development Schools Scheme in 2005-2007 to assist other secondary schools in their implementing curriculum reform in the Chinese subject.
Being conferred the Health School Silver Award by the Chinese University of Hong Kong in 2006, recognized by the World Health Organization.
Having achieved high value-addedness in students’ academic results, based on the value-addedness studies conducted by the Education Bureau

External links

Official Website of Shatin Tsung Tsin Secondary School

Educational institutions established in 1985
Protestant secondary schools in Hong Kong 
Tai Wai
1985 establishments in Hong Kong